was a town located in Kitamatsuura District, Nagasaki Prefecture, Japan.

As of 2003, the town had an estimated population of 4,148 and a density of 129.54 persons per km2. The total area was 32.02 km2.

On April 1, 2005, Sechibaru, along with the town of Yoshii (also from Kitamatsuura District), was merged into the expanded city of Sasebo.

The onset of the 1950s brought rapid growth, with coal extraction bringing the railway and many new workers to Sechibaru. When the coal ran out, the town had only its older tea industry to rely on, which lacked the economic strength to keep the trains or people coming back.

Dissolved municipalities of Nagasaki Prefecture
Sasebo